Itay Zvulun (born May 13, 1984), known professionally by his stage name Tuna, is an Israeli rapper, singer, songwriter and actor.

Musical career 
Tuna was part of the Israeli group HaShevet. In 2006 they released their debut album.

In 2010 Tuna formed a band called Tunaman Jones with his friend Nir Danan. In 2011 their debut album was released.

In 2015 he released his debut album, This Too Shall Pass (Gam Zeh Ya’avor) which saw praise.

In 2017 he released his second album, TunaPark to positive reviews. The album included the single-hits "Yud Aleph 2" and "Seharhoret" which saw success in the Israeli weekly and annual charts.

In 2019 he released his third album, Ve'Achshav La'Helek Ha'Intergalacti (And Now for the Intergalactic Part). The title and artwork pay homage to Ravid Plotnik's album, Ve'Achshav La'Helek Ha'Omanuti.

Discography

Studio albums 

 2006: The Tribe (HaShevet, השבט), with HaShevet
 2011: Tunaman Jones (טונהמן ג'ונס), with Tunaman Jones
 2015: This Too Shall Pass, solo
 2017: TunaPark, solo
 2019: And Now for the Intergalactic Part, solo
 2021: “Wild East” (Mizrach Paruah), solo

Mixtapes 

 2010: Mixtape Baby (מיקסטייפ בייבי), with Tunaman Jones
 2010: Mixtape Baby 2 (מיקסטייפ בייבי 2), with Tunaman Jones
 2012: End of Rhymes Season (Sof Onat Ha'Haruzim, סוף עונת החרוזים), with Shotgunz

References 

1984 births
21st-century Israeli male  singers
Israeli male singer-songwriters
Israeli rappers
Jewish rappers
Israeli male television actors
Israeli hip hop record producers
Living people
People from Petah Tikva